The Amazing Adventures of Morph is a British stop-motion clay animation television show created by Aardman Animations which ran from 1980 to 1981. It featured the character Morph and his cream-coloured best friend Chas.

Production
The character of Morph first appeared on the children's art-themed TV show Take Hart with Tony Hart in 1977. This series served as a spin-off to Take Hart and a showcase for Morph. The character had become so popular that the BBC commissioned 26 5-min episodes featuring the character.

Characters
As well as Morph and his cream-coloured best friend Chas from previous appearances,  the show incorporated various additional characters; Folly (a female tinfoil figure), Gillespie (large, blue and dim-witted), GrandMorph (an elderly grey-bearded version of Morph with a skateboard and a knack for inventing things), Delilah (a blonde female in a yellow dress and glasses who serves as a straight character) Nailbrush (a nailbrush dog), Gobbledygook (a green alien) and The Very Small Creatures. Early versions of Folly and Gillespie had previously made a brief appearance in Take Hart.

Cast
Tony Hart as Narrator (voice)
Morph 
Chas 
Nailbrush 
Grandmorph 
Delilah 
Gillespie 
Folly 
Gobbledygook 
The Very Small Creatures 
The Paint Pots

Episodes
(Actual original episode titles and dates were sourced from Radio Times and BBC Genome)
 The Beginning (13 October 1980)
 The Day Nothing Happened (15 October 1980)
 Morph Plays Golf (16 October 1980)
 Morph's Birthday Party (17 October 1980)
 The Day Morph Was Ill (20 October 1980)
 Morph's Forgotten Dream (22 October 1980)
 Morph the Weakling (21 October 1980)
 The Dog Show (23 October 1980)
 The Two Mountaineers (24 October 1980)
 The Double Decker Boot (27 October 1980)
 The Cowboys (30 October 1980)
 The Day Morph Went Ski-ing (31 October 1980)
 The Abominable Snowman (3 November 1980)
 The Invisible Morph (6 November 1980)
 Anyone for Cricket? (7 November 1980)
 A Swimming Pool in the Garden (27 April 1981)
 The Strange Visitor (29 April 1981)
 A Game of Chess (1 May 1981)
 Very Small Creature Green (6 May 1981)
 Grandmorph's Beard (7 May 1981)
 The Baby-Sitters (8 May 1981)
 Morph Sticks With It (11 May 1981)
 Gobbledegook the Burglar (13 May 1981)
 Grandmorph's Home Movies (14 May 1981)
 Morph and the Swoggle-Flange (15 May 1981)
 The Magic Wand (18 May 1981)

Online re-release

From 20 March to 2 October 2015, HD restored versions of all 26 episodes of the series had appeared on YouTube.

Critical reception
MSN UK said "It would be fantastic to see this show back on terrestrial TV - it was entertaining and original."

Awards and nominations

|-
| 1981
| Patrick Dowling
| BAFTA TV Award for 'Harlequin' (Drama/Light Entertainment)
| 
|}

References

External links

1980s British animated television series
1980s British children's television series
1980 British television series debuts
1981 British television series endings
British children's animated adventure television series
British children's animated comedy television series
British children's animated fantasy television series
Clay animation television series
English-language television shows
Television series by Aardman Animations
British television series with live action and animation